Sheepwash may refer to:

 Sheepwash, Devon, England
 Sheepwash, Northumberland, England
 Sheepwash, North Yorkshire, England

See also
 Sheepwash Channel, Oxford, England
 Sheepwash Urban Park, a Local Nature Reserve in the West Midlands, England